Pratham (also Prathama, Prathamesh) (Sanskrit: प्रथम) is a Hindu/Sanskrit Indian male given name meaning ′first′. Pratham may refer to:

Organisations
 Pratham, a non-governmental organisation in India
 Pratham Mysore, a non-governmental organisation in India
 Prathama Blood Centre, a blood bank in Gujarat, India

Science
 Pratham, an Indian satellite launched in 26 September 2016

People
 Pratham, an Indian Kannada film actor
 Pratham Singh, an Indian cricketer
 Prathamesh Maulingkar, an Indian footballer 
 Prathamesh Mokal, an Indian chess player
 Prathamesh Parab, an Indian Marathi film actor
 Prathamesh Laghate, an Indian Marathi singer

Places
 Bhangri Pratham Khanda, an Indian town in West Bengal

Media
 Pratham Kadam Phool, an Indian 1969 Bengali film
 Pratham Pratishruti, an Indian 1964 Bengali novel written by Ashapurna Devi
 Ranur Pratham Bhag, an Indian 1972 Bengali drama film

Others
 Pratham Swatrantata Sangram Express, a train service in India